Uruk GNU/Linux-libre is a PureOS-based Linux distribution. The name Uruk is an Iraqi city that states its Iraqi origin.
Uruk GNU/Linux 1.0 was released on 13 April 2016 and it ships with the most common software for popular tasks.

Features 
Uruk uses Linux-libre kernel for the system and MATE desktop environment for its graphical interfaces.

One of the special features of Uruk is the ability to run various types of package managers at ease (including GNU Guix, urpmi, pacman, dnf). It implements simple one-line command to do that, that use a program named Package Managers Simulator to simulate the commands of popular package managers.

Version history

See also 
 Parabola GNU/Linux-libre
 Linux-libre

References

External links 
 
 
 Uruk Project on SourceForge.net

Operating system distributions bootable from read-only media
X86-64 Linux distributions
Free software only Linux distributions
Linux distributions